Amblyseius herbicoloides is a species of mite in the family Phytoseiidae.

References

herbicoloides
Articles created by Qbugbot
Animals described in 1984